Justin Bevis (born 17 September 1996 in Sydney, Australia), better known as Justin Holborow, is an Australian actor, best known for his roles as Harley Canning in Eleven's Neighbours, Jack Stewart in Reef Doctors, and as Griff in the TV adaptation of Conspiracy 365.

Early life and education

Holborow was born on 17 September 1996 in Sydney, Australia. His mother, Sarah Holborow, is a designer. He has one younger sister, Tahli Bevis.

Holborow moved to Bangkok at the age of 12, where he was educated at Harrow International School for over a year, where he played Bugsy in a production of Bugsy Malone, after which he moved back to Sydney with his mother and sister, where he was educated at Newtown High School of the Performing Arts. After being cast in Reef Doctors at the age of 14, he moved to Queensland, where he continued his education part-time. Holborow currently lives in Sydney.

Filmography

External links
 

1996 births
Living people
Australian male film actors
Australian male television actors
People educated at Newtown High School of the Performing Arts
Male actors from Sydney